Jani Kristian Volanen  (born 1 November 1971, in Helsinki) is a Finnish actor/writer/director. He has appeared in more than fifty TV- and movie-productions and thirty professional theater productions since 1986. Volanen has also created and directed many comedy-shows for Finnish television. Volanen often plays characters with personality disorders.

Selected filmography

References

External links 
 

1971 births
Living people
Male actors from Helsinki
Writers from Helsinki